The women's javelin throw at the 2019 World Para Athletics Championships was held in Dubai on 7, 10 and 11 November 2019.

Medalists

Detailed results

F13 

The event was held on 11 November.

F34 

The event was held on 10 November.

F46 

The event was held on 11 November.

F54 

The event was held on 7 November.

F56 

The event was held on 11 November.

See also 
List of IPC world records in athletics

References 

javelin throw
2019 in women's athletics
Javelin throw at the World Para Athletics Championships